Arhopala florinda is a species of butterfly belonging to the lycaenid family described by Henley Grose-Smith in 1896. It is found  in the Australasian realm where it is endemic to the Solomon Islands.

Subspecies
A. f. florinda Guadalcanal
A. f. pagenstecheri (Ribbe, 1899) New Britain

References

External links
"Arhopala Boisduval, 1832" at Markku Savela's Lepidoptera and Some Other Life Forms

Arhopala
Butterflies described in 1896